Hunan Restaurant was a Chinese restaurant in Portland, Oregon.

History 
The Liu family opened Hunan Restaurant in Morgan's Alley in downtown Portland in 1979. The restaurant closed in 2014.

Reception 
Grant Butler included Hunan Restaurant in The Oregonians 2016 list of "Tasty memories: 97 long-gone Portland restaurants we wish were still around", writing: "For 35 years, this Chinese restaurant in downtown's Morgan's Alley was the place for hot-and-spicy fare served with flare, like the Dragon and the Phoenix, a dish combining crab and chicken, served with delicate flowers sculpted from apples and cucumbers. It was one of the first Portland restaurants to serve the now-ubiquitous General Tso's chicken, and there were specialties not seen elsewhere at the time, like tea-smoked duck served in tiny pancakes with plum sauce."

See also
 List of Chinese restaurants
 List of defunct restaurants of the United States

References

External links 

 Human Restaurant at Zomato

1979 establishments in Oregon
2014 disestablishments in Oregon
Defunct Chinese restaurants in Portland, Oregon
Restaurants disestablished in 2014
Restaurants established in 1979
Southwest Portland, Oregon